Legislative Assembly elections were held in Chhattisgarh in December 2003, electing the 90 members of the first Chhattisgarh Legislative Assembly. 2003 elections were the first election in Chhattisgarh after its formation from Madhya Pradesh. The results of the election were announced in early December. Incumbent Chief Minister Ajit Jogi lost the election, while Bharatiya Janata Party won the elections. Raman Singh was sworn-in as chief minister.

Results

Elected members

External links
 

 State Assembly elections in Chhattisgarh
2000s in Chhattisgarh
Chhattisgarh